The 2015–16 Mauritian Premier League season is the 36th season of top-flight football in Mauritius. Cercle de Joachim are the defending champions having won their second title in consecutive seasons. The season got underway on 24 October 2015 and finished on 10 July 2016. Port-Louis won the league.

Teams
The 2015–16 Mauritian Premier League campaign consisted of ten sides.

League table

References

Mauritian Premier League seasons
Mauritius
Prem
Prem